Einav Galili (‎; born 21 April 1969) is an Israeli journalist, satirist, television host and radio host.

Biography
Einav Galili was born on Kibbutz Na'an. She is the daughter of Eilat Galili and granddaughter of Yisrael Galili, a Knesset member who served as  Information Minister of Israel in 1967–1969. She has two children.

References

Living people
1969 births
Israeli journalists
Israeli women journalists
Israeli television presenters
Israeli women television presenters